Lohrville may refer to a place in the United States: 

 Lohrville, Iowa
 Lohrville, Wisconsin